Walter Robertson Currie (2 December 1895 – 1979) was a Scottish footballer who played in the Football League for Bristol Rovers and Leicester City.

References

1895 births
1965 deaths
Scottish footballers
Association football wing halves
English Football League players
Scottish Football League players
Cowdenbeath F.C. players
East Fife F.C. players
Raith Rovers F.C. players
Leicester City F.C. players
Bristol Rovers F.C. players
Clackmannan F.C. players
Lochgelly United F.C. players
People from Cardenden
Footballers from Fife
Scottish Junior Football Association players